The 1931 Frankford Yellow Jackets season was their eighth and final in the National Football League. The team failed to improve on their previous season's record of 4–13–1, winning only one league game. The team has the dubious distinction of winning only a single NFL game by a single point, and was held scoreless in seven of their eight league games, including the first five of the season.

On July 27, 1931, the team's home, Frankford Stadium, was severely damaged by fire, forcing the team to divide its 1931 home games between Municipal Stadium and the Phillies' Philadelphia Ball Park.

Roster
Marger Apsit
Nate Barragar
Bull Behman
Justin Brumbaugh
Bill Fleckenstein
Herb Joesting
Tom Jones
Mort Kaer
Art Koeninger
Tony Kostos
Tom Leary
Mickey McDonnell
Warner Mizell
Mally Nydahl
Jim Pederson
Art Pharmer
Frank Racis
Carroll Ringwalt
Herman Seborg
Cookie Tackwell
Lee Wilson

Schedule

Standings

References

Frankford Yellow Jackets seasons
Frankford Yellow Jackets